Arthur L. Hall (April 18, 1934 – July 6, 2000) was an African American dancer, choreographer, and teacher.

He founded the Arthur Hall Afro-American Dance Ensemble, a group based in Philadelphia and active from the 1970s - 1988, which combined modern and traditional African dance. He taught dance at Dartmouth College among other schools. Hall served as cultural arts director of the Model Cities Program in Philadelphia.

References

Sources
Francis Kobina Saighoe. "Traditional African American Music in Black American Socio-Cultural Interaction" African Music Editor. No 8. Dec 1996. p 28

1934 births
2000 deaths
American choreographers